Balaka tahitensis is a palm, a species of flowering plant in the family Arecaceae. It is endemic to Samoa.

Distribution
Balaka tahitensis is found on Upolu and Savai'i, in understory forest to about 800m elevation

References

tahitensis
Endemic flora of Samoa